Kevin Jiang was a Chinese-American graduate student at Yale University who was fatally shot in New Haven, Connecticut on February 6, 2021.

Background 
Jiang was born in Seattle, Washington on February 14, 1994. Before pursuing his master's degree in environmental science at Yale, Jiang attended North Seattle College and the University of Washington, where he graduated magna cum laude. He served in the US Army National Guard as an environmental scientist and engineering officer. At Yale, he volunteered at a homeless shelter and the Trinity Baptist Church.

On January 30, 2021, he became engaged to Zion Perry, a fellow Yale graduate student.

Death 
At around 8:30 p.m. on February 6, 2021, Jiang was shot in the face and body multiple times at close range after leaving Perry's apartment, in the East Rock neighborhood of New Haven. Neighbors reported hearing at least seven gunshots. Emergency responders were unable to revive him.

Official investigation 
On February 10, 2021, New Haven police announced that they were seeking Qinxuan Pan, a PhD candidate at the Massachusetts Institute of Technology, and that they considered Pan to be "armed and dangerous." The U.S. Marshals Service charged him with unlawful flight to avoid prosecution and interstate theft of a vehicle. Perry told investigators that she had befriended Pan at the Massachusetts Institute of Technology, but that they never had a romantic relationship.

In mid-February, Pan was spotted in Atlanta, driving with relatives. On April 8, 2021, an international warrant was issued for Pan on murder and larceny charges. On May 14, 2021, Pan was apprehended in Montgomery, Alabama, where he was living under the false name "Henry Choi" and in possession of $19,000 cash, his father's passport, and seven cell phones.  His bail was set at $20 million. 

On December 9, 2022, Pan pled not guilty after Judge Jon Alander determined there was probable cause for the charges filed against him. The next hearing will be in February 2023.

References 

2021 murders in the United States
February 2021 events in the United States